American guitarist Jimi Hendrix intended to release his fourth studio album as a double or triple LP before Christmas 1970. From June to August 1970, he made good progress on the realization of the planned album in his new Electric Lady Studios. Many songs were mixed on 20, 22 and 24 August. Four of these mixes were regarded as definitive versions and were presented at the opening party of Electric Lady on 26 August. Hendrix died on September 18 that year, leaving behind an enormous number of unreleased recordings in various stages of completion. It is impossible to know what Hendrix would have changed and what he actually would have released, but there is some documentation of the album configurations he had in mind. While a good part of the designated tracks only needed some finishing touches, others only existed as rough recordings and for some titles no recordings are known at all. The Cry of Love (1971), Voodoo Soup (1995) and First Rays of the New Rising Sun (1997) are officially released attempts to reconstruct the planned album. First Rays of the New Rising Sun is usually regarded as closest to Hendrix's vision, but features a track that was probably never part of Hendrix's plans and omits some tracks that were definitely considered. All but one of the tracks that are known to have been recorded for the album have eventually been released in some shape or other on official albums.

Background
After finishing the double album Electric Ladyland in 1968, Hendrix recorded quite obsessively in several studios. The extensive sessions for Electric Ladyland had been a reason for Chas Chandler to quit his role of producer, and also soured Hendrix's relation with bass player Noel Redding. Redding eventually quit the band at the end of June 1969. Hendrix had already started recording with old-time friend and bass player Billy Cox. For much of 1969 and 1970 Hendrix was troubled by the constant touring, disappointment in the new band line-ups (first the Gypsy Sun and Rainbows - despite the successful Woodstock performance - and then the Band of Gypsys), demands of manager Michael Jeffrey, girlfriend troubles, the pressure of fame, heavy drug use and personal as well as professional insecurities. Hendrix's extensive use of hired studio time became very expensive and was not always fruitful. In 1969 plans for Hendrix's own nightclub in New York City were converted into a plan for his own recording studio. Electric Lady's Studio A was designed to serve as Hendrix's personal creative space; an inspiring environment where he could develop his music from demos to final mixes, with a supportive team and the best equipment available. After being under construction for 13 months, the first session at Electric Lady's Studio A took place on 15 June 1970 - while Studio B was still unfinished. The studio finally provided creative continuity in a safe haven, but also a place where he could find some rest. There was 24-hour security and Kramer set strict rules to stop having hordes of guests in the studio. Despite the lack of pay for the sessions, Hendrix was mostly joined by the current Experience band members Billy Cox and Mitch Mitchell. Mitchell even had to battle Jeffrey for back royalties and tour receipts and it may initially have been unpleasant for him that many tracks that were worked on had Buddy Miles's drum parts, but eventually Mitchell got into the creative spirit of working on the album as much as the ever loyal Cox. Hendrix and his team soon showed much progress in the creation of a new album, so the studio time of August 1970 was almost exclusively used for mixing and overdubbing sessions to finish the recorded songs. On 26 August 1970 four complete songs with final mixes were presented at the Electric Lady opening party. The next morning, Hendrix left for Europe to perform at a couple of festivals and would never see his studio again: he died in London on 18 September 1970.

Tracks considered for inclusion
A 24 June 1970 memo by Hendrix listed 11 songs "having backing tracks completed", with the last entries "Drifter's Escape", and "Burning Desire", receiving question marks. This memo also noted to get the tape of Highway Chile. 

An expanded list of 25 titles was handwritten by Hendrix (reportedly on 14 August 1970) under the heading "Songs for L.P. Strate Ahead". The running order is the same for the eleven tracks of the previous list, but many tracks are added in between. The songs with complete backing tracks were marked with crosses. The list also had songs marked with ticks and dashes, but the meaning of those marks is unknown.  

"Message to Love", "Power of Soul", and "Machine Gun"  had been recorded in the studio before live versions were released on the Band of Gypsys album. Hendrix seemed to think that releasing studio versions of these songs would be regressive and not in tune with his ideas for the new album. Nonetheless, a mix of "Power of Soul" with a new delay effect in the intro and a mix of "Message to Love" were created on 22 August 1970. 

Another list in someone else's handwriting on a tape box detailed the configuration for three sides of a double album with the title First Rays Of The New Rising Sun. Side D was left blank and two tracks appeared twice, on different sides of the LP.

Unlisted nearly finished new tracks 

Work in August 1970 was reserved for finalizing tracks for the album with overdubs and mixes. There are some tracks that received attention during these mixing sessions that were not included on the lists (possibly because new recordings were made after the lists were compiled): 
 Beginnings: an instrumental track that was developed from a jam while preparing for Woodstock and subsequently performed live at the festival. Studio recordings for the track and a rough mix were made on 22-08-1970. 
 In From the Storm: lead guitar and vocal overdubs were recorded on 20-08-1970, a rough mix was created two days later
 Message to Love: a mix was created by Hendrix and Kramer on 22-08-1970, after work had been abandoned when a live recording was included on Band of Gypsys
 Power of Soul: a mix was created by Hendrix and either engineer Bob Hughes or Eddie Kramer on 22-08-1970, after work had been abandoned when a live recording was included on Band of Gypsys
 Belly Button Window: a basic track with the new Experience was recorded on 23-07-1970. Hendrix then recorded a very different solo demo on 22-08 and made a rough mix together with Kramer on 24-08-1970

Abandoned Electric Lady recordings
Almost all the recordings at Electric Lady were made with the planned album in mind, but some were incidental jams or compositions that were abandoned:
 All God's Children: an instrumental backing track recorded on 15-06-1970 onto which Hendrix possibly wanted to overdub vocals later
 Messing Around: a funky instrumental that was abandoned after 20 takes on 16-06-1970 
 Bolero: an instrumental recorded on 01-07-1970, segueing into Hey Baby (New Rising Sun) (reportedly intended to flow together as recorded, but unreleased until 2010). No further work seems to have been done on the track until Eddie Kramer mixed it for release on West Coast Seattle Boy.
 Pali Gap: originally part of a circa 10-minute instrumental jam recorded on 01-07-1970. Hendrix realized it had some potential and overdubbed a second guitar and a solo to what would be marked as Slow Part on the tape box. Kramer claims it was never intended to be on the planned album. Michael Jeffrey later gave it the title Pali Gap to tie it to the Hawaiian locale of the Rainbow Bridge film when it was to be released on the accompanying album.
 Slow Blues: less than three minutes of a jam that was only recorded partly on 20-08-1970. A 1:46 edit was released on The Jimi Hendrix Experience box set in 2000.

Album titles
Hendrix preferred the title First Rays Of The New Rising Sun since January 1969. Eddie Kramer believed this would have been the definitive title and it was used for the official reconstructed album release in 1997.

Hendrix christened his 1970 tour The Cry of Love Tour in an interview. During the tour Lover Man, Hear My Train A Comin''', Freedom, Hey Baby (Land of the New Rising Sun), Ezy Ryder, Machine Gun, The Star-Spangled Banner, Straight Ahead, Midnight Lightning, Dolly Dagger, Room Full of Mirrors, and In from the Storm were performed along with tracks known from his previous albums and singles. The first posthumous studio album, released in 1971, was named after the tour.

When work in his Electric Lady Studios advanced, Hendrix imagined it could become a triple album with the title People, Hell and Angels. In 2013 this title was used for a compilation of unreleased material.

A memo from August 1970 in his handwriting had 25 titles under the heading Songs for L.P. Strate Ahead.

Singles

On 13 April 1970 Reprise Records released Stepping Stone and Izabella as a 7" single credited to "Hendrix Band of Gypsys". It was reportedly recalled because it could interfere with the sales of the Band of Gypsys live album that was delivered to Capitol Records to fulfill a contractual obligation.

A single with Dolly Dagger b/w Night Bird Flying was mastered on 26 August 1970 and test pressings were cut and taken by Kramer and Hendrix for review . The planned release by Reprise Records was cancelled after Hendrix's death.

Posthumous releases
Of the ten tracks on The Cry of Love (1971) nine songs were on Hendrix's lists and/or were being prepared for the album by Hendrix during the mixing sessions in August 1970. The other track, My Friend, was recorded in 1968. After Manager Michael Jeffrey had decided to save Dolly Dagger and Room Full of Mirrors to be released on Rainbow Bridge the tracks My Friend and Straight Ahead were selected instead. Eddie Kramer and Mitch Mitchell produced some finishing touches to Drifting, Angel and In from the storm. A rough mix of a demo for Belly Button Window was included without alterations.Voodoo Soup (1995) was producer Alan Douglas' attempt to compile the unfinished album. 
  First Rays of the New Rising Sun (1997) is the officially released attempt by Experience Hendrix (his family estate's company) in collaboration with Eddie Kramer to reconstruct the planned double album. It is a compilation of 17 songs that previously appeared on The Cry of Love, Rainbow Bridge and War Heroes. Like The Cry of Love it includes the 1968 recording of My Friend'', while the other 16 tracks were more clearly intended for the album.

Many of the tracks have been released over the years in several different versions, including mixes that Hendrix made during the sessions of 20, 22 and 24 August 1970.

References

Works cited

 

Jimi Hendrix albums
Unreleased albums
1970 in American music
Unfinished albums